Inheritance is a 2012 drama film directed by and starring Hiam Abbass in her feature film directorial debut. It premiered at the Venice Film Festival and Haifa International Film Festival.

Plot
A Palestinian family living in a small Muslim village in Galilee gathers to celebrate the wedding of one of their daughters, as war rages between Israel and Lebanon. Its many members symbolise a community struggling to maintain its identity, torn between modernity and tradition. In the midst of it all is a forbidden love story between the youngest daughter, Hajar (Hafsia Herzi), who has returned from studying abroad, and her Christian lover (Tom Payne). When their father falls into a coma and inches toward death, internal conflicts explode and the familial battles become as merciless as the outside war.

Cast
Hafsia Herzi as Hajar
Hiam Abbass as Samira
Yussef Abu Warda as Khalil
Ashraf Barhom as Ahmad
Ruba Blal as Saada
Clara Khoury as Salma
Makram Khoury as Abu Majd
Khalifa Natour as Majd
Tom Payne as Matthew
Lina Soualem as Alya
Mouna Soualem as Lana
Ali Suliman as Marwan
Ula Tabari as Zeinab
G. A. Wasi as Cousin Ali

Production
Abbass has stated: "Generally, when you are speaking about Palestinians, you think of them in Ramallah, or the refugees in Syria. Instead I wanted to tell this important part of society: the Palestinians of Israel, who feel partially excluded from the country in which they live, which is why they try and preserve their identity through a strong family structure which makes them feel at home."

References

External links

2012 films
2010s Hebrew-language films
2010s French-language films
2010s Arabic-language films
2010s English-language films
Israeli drama films
French drama films
Turkish drama films
2012 drama films
French multilingual films
Israeli multilingual films
Turkish multilingual films
2012 multilingual films
2010s French films